The 2022 A Lyga, for sponsorship reasons also called Optibet A lyga was the 33rd season of the A Lyga, the top-tier football league of Lithuania. The season began on 4 March and concluded on 23 November 2022.

Teams
FK Žalgiris started the season as defending champions. DFK Dainava and FK Nevėžis were relegated, and replaced with FA Šiauliai and FK Jonava. All teams that were eligible to participate in A lyga based on sporting principle have successfully passed the licensing process for the first time in recent years.

Managers

Current Managers

Managerial changes

Regular season

League table

Fixtures and results

Rounds 1–18

Rounds 19–36

Relegation play-offs 
The 9th team, FC Džiugas Telšiai, played a play-off against the second-placed team from I Lyga, FK Neptūnas, for the remaining spot in the league. The first match, in Klaipeda, ended with a 4–0 win for Džiugas. In the rematch, Džiugas won at home 1-0, therefore stayed in the league with 5-0 aggregate.

First leg

Second leg

Top scorers

See also
 Football in Lithuania
 2022 Lithuanian Football Cup

References

External links
 

LFF Lyga seasons
2022 in Lithuanian football